Ultra is an unincorporated community in Tulare County, California, United States.

A branch of the Atchison, Topeka and Santa Fe Railway ran through Ultra.  The line was sold to the Tulare Valley Railroad in 1992, and was abandoned in 2009.

References

Unincorporated communities in Tulare County, California
Unincorporated communities in California